James C. Duff is a former director of the Administrative Office of the U.S. Courts. He served from 2006 to 2011, and again from 2015 to 2020.

The Newseum

From September 2011 to December 2014, Duff was chief executive officer of the Newseum, an interactive museum of news in Washington, D.C., that promotes free expression and the five freedoms of the First Amendment to the United States Constitution; president and CEO of the museum's Newseum Institute, which serves as a forum for First Amendment study, exploration and education; and president and CEO of the Freedom Forum, a nonpartisan foundation that supports education about the First Amendment.

Education and early career
Duff graduated magna cum laude from the University of Kentucky Honors Program in 1975 with a degree in political science and philosophy, where he was Phi Beta Kappa. He also was a walk-on on the university's basketball team. 

After studying at the University of Edinburgh in Scotland in 1974, he returned to the U.S. in 1975 and worked for four years as an aide in the chambers of Chief Justice Warren E. Burger. He graduated from Georgetown Law in 1981, then worked at the law firm Clifford and Warnke, where in 1990 he became a partner. 

In 1991, a large contingent of Clifford and Warnke lawyers and staff, including Duff, merged with the firm of Howrey and Simon, where he practiced antitrust, commercial litigation, and international trade until 1996.

Legal and political career
From 1996 to 2000, Duff was Chief Justice William Rehnquist's Administrative Assistant, now called "Counselor to the Chief Justice," serving as his liaison with the other branches of government and as executive director of the Judicial Fellows Commission. He preceded Sally Rider as the Chief Justice's chief of staff, in which Duff assisted Rehnquist in his roles as chair of the Judicial Conference of the United States and the Federal Judicial Center Board. He also served as counselor to the Chief Justice as presiding officer of the U.S. Senate's 1999 presidential impeachment trial.

From 2000 to 2006, Duff served as the managing partner of the Washington office of Baker, Donelson, Bearman, Caldwell & Berkowitz, which was opened by former Majority Leader Howard Baker Jr. There he represented the Federal Judges Association before Congress as well as the Freedom Forum.. He also represented the University of Kentucky's federal government interests in Washington and at the request of NCAA President Myles Brand, in 2006 he authored an overview and report to the NCAA on its rules and procedures. Duff has taught constitutional law at Georgetown University as an adjunct professor. He was named the Peter Mullen Professor of Law at Georgetown University for the fall of 2014 and previously served as the first lecturer of the Giles Seminar at Georgetown for two years.

In September 2005, Duff was a pallbearer at Rehnquist's funeral, alongside seven of Rehnquist's former law clerks. Duff authored a tribute to Chief Justice Rehnquist in the November 2005 edition of the Harvard Law Review  and spoke at the unveiling Ceremony for the William H. Rehnquist bust in the Great Hall of the Supreme Court in December 2009.

From July 2006 through September 15, 2011, Duff served as Director of the Administrative Office of the United States Courts. He was appointed in April 2006 by United States Chief Justice John Roberts. On May 31, 2011, Duff announced that he was stepping down to assume the position of CEO at the Freedom Forum.

He was appointed to the Georgetown Law Center's Board of Visitors in 2014 and serves on the boards of Freedom House, the Supreme Court Historical Society and the University of Kentucky Arts & Sciences Advisory Board. He was named to the University of Kentucky Arts & Sciences Hall of Fame in 2012 and was given the Georgetown Entertainment and Media Law Achievement Award in 2012. Duff was elected to the membership at the American Law Institute in 2016.

On November 4, 2014, it was announced by Chief Justice John Roberts that Duff would once again become Director of the Administrative Office of the United States Courts, effective January 1, 2015. He  succeeded Director Judge John D. Bates. He retired on December 31, 2020.

Personal life
Duff and his wife, Kathleen Gallagher Duff, live in Bethesda, Maryland, and have three children.

References

External links

The Supreme Court Fellows Program
Serving in the Chief Justice's Shadow (Information about Sally Rider)

American lawyers
Living people
People from Bethesda, Maryland
Georgetown University Law Center alumni
University of Kentucky alumni
Year of birth missing (living people)